Ernesto Mombelli (1867–1932) was an Italian general. He was the governor of Cyrenaica from mid-1924 to December 1926.

Formerly fought in the Italo-Turkish War, then, during the First World War, he led the Italian 35th division in the Macedonian front from 1917 to 1918. During the occupation of Constantinople by the Allies following the war he was the commander of the Italian forces.

For his service in Macedonia, and his representation of his home country in the inter-allied military mission to Hungary, he was awarded the US army's distinguished service medal by US president.

See also
Vardar Offensive

Notes

1867 births
1932 deaths
Italian generals
Italian colonial governors and administrators
Italian military personnel of the Italo-Turkish War
Italian military personnel of World War I
People of the Hungarian–Romanian War
Military personnel from Turin
Commanders of the Order of Saints Maurice and Lazarus
Officers of the Military Order of Savoy
Commanders of the Military Order of Savoy
Recipients of the Distinguished Service Medal (US Army)